Vladimir Mikhailovich Arays (born 29 January 1961) is a Russian professional football coach and a former player.

Playing career
He made his debut in the Soviet Second League in 1979 for FC Irtysh Omsk.

Honours

Individual
 Russian Professional Football League Zone East best coach (2018–19).

References

1961 births
Sportspeople from Omsk
Living people
Soviet footballers
Russian footballers
Association football defenders
FC Irtysh Omsk players
FC Fakel Voronezh players
Russian football managers